The King of All the World is a 2021 musical drama film directed and written by Carlos Saura. A Mexico-Spain co-production, the cast is led by Ana de la Reguera, Manuel García Rulfo, Damián Alcázar, Enrique Arce, Manolo Cardona, Isaac Hernández and Greta Elizondo.

Plot 
Manuel—a stage director—invites Sara—a renowned choreographer—to help him with a new musical. They cast Inés—a young dancer—to star in the musical act.

Cast

Production 
A Mexico-Spain international co-production, The King of All the World was produced by Pipa Films and Pacha Inversiones y Producciones Audiovisuales, in collaboration with Canal 44 and COFIEJ and with support from EFICINE and the Universidad de Guadalajara. Vittorio Storaro worked as director of cinematography. Eusebio Pacha took over production duties. Filming took place in Guadalajara, Jalisco, primarily at the Conjunto Santander de Artes Escénicas. It began on 4 March 2019 and wrapped on 15 April 2019.

Release 
The film screened on 4 October 2021 at the 36th Guadalajara Film Festival (FICG). It is set to screen at the 66th Valladolid Film Festival (SEMINCI). Distributed by Syldavia Cinema, it will be theatrically released in Spain on 12 November 2021. It is also selected as opening film at the 52nd International Film Festival of India to be screened on 20 November 2021.

See also 

 List of Spanish films of 2021

References

External links
 The King of All the World at ICAA's Catálogo de Cinespañol
 

2020s Spanish-language films
2021 films
2020s Spanish films
Films shot in Mexico
2020s dance films
2020s musical drama films
Mexican musical drama films
Spanish musical drama films
Films directed by Carlos Saura